Zozo is a Swedish-Lebanese drama film which was released to cinemas in Sweden on 2 September 2005.

Plot
Zozo tells the story of a Lebanese boy (Imad Creidi), during the civil war, who gets separated from his family and ends up in Sweden.

Production
The film was directed by Swedish-Lebanese director Josef Fares. The story is mostly inspired by Fares' real life immigration to Sweden during the war.

The film was Sweden's representative for Best Foreign film at the 78th Academy Awards. It won The Nordic Council Film Prize in 2006.

See also 
 List of submissions to the 78th Academy Awards for Best Foreign Language Film
 List of Swedish submissions for the Academy Award for Best Foreign Language Film

References

External links 

Trailer of the movie

2005 films
2000s coming-of-age drama films
2000s Arabic-language films
Lebanese Civil War films
Films about children
Films about families
Films about homelessness
Films about immigration
Films about orphans
Films directed by Josef Fares
Films set in Lebanon
Films set in Sweden
Films set in the 1980s
Swedish coming-of-age drama films
2000s Swedish-language films
Lebanese drama films
2005 drama films
2005 multilingual films
Lebanese multilingual films
Swedish multilingual films
2000s Swedish films